Rich Mountain Electric Cooperative is a non-profit rural electric utility cooperative headquartered in Mena, Arkansas, United States with a district office in Dierks, Arkansas.

The cooperative serves portions of six counties in the states of Arkansas and Oklahoma, in a territory generally surrounding Mena.

As of September 2005, the Cooperative had more than 1,500 miles of power lines, and served over 7,600 customers.

External links
 Rich Mountain Electric Cooperative

Companies based in Arkansas
Electric cooperatives in Arkansas
Electric cooperatives in Oklahoma